Ben Arnold is an unincorporated community and census-designated place in Milam County, Texas, United States. Ben Arnold (Benarnold) is on U.S. Highway 77 seven miles north of Cameron in northern Milam County.

Per the 2020 census, the population was 117.

History
The community began as a stop on the San Antonio and Aransas Pass Railway in 1890 and was named for Bennie Arnold, B. I. Arnold's three-year-old daughter, who was mascot on the first train to pull into the new station. A local post office was opened in 1892, and by 1896 the community had three churches, a district school, and 125 residents.

In 1903 the school had two teachers and eighty students. In the 1920s the population of Ben Arnold rose to 250; it remained fairly stable until the late 1960s, when it fell to 148. The Ben Arnold school system was consolidated with the Cameron Independent School District by the early 1970s. In 1977 the Southern Pacific abandoned the section of track connecting Ben Arnold with Cameron to the south and Rosebud to the north. The community had 148 residents and several businesses in 1990. The population remained the same in 2000.

Notable people
Dede Westbrook, footballer

References

Census-designated places in Milam County, Texas
Census-designated places in Texas
Unincorporated communities in Milam County, Texas
Unincorporated communities in Texas